Dolichoderus cornutus is an extinct species of Eocene ant in the genus Dolichoderus. Described by Mayr in 1868, the fossils were discovered in the Baltic amber, where a fossilised worker ant was only described, and it is presumed these ants existed at least 40 million years ago.

References

†
Eocene insects
Prehistoric insects of Europe
Fossil taxa described in 1868
Fossil ant taxa